Texas International Airlines Flight 655, registration N94230, was a Convair 600 turboprop aircraft en route from El Dorado to Texarkana, Arkansas, crashing into Black Fork Mountain, Arkansas, on the night of September 27, 1973. The eight passengers and three crewmembers on board were killed.

Events
The route from El Dorado to Texarkana was part of a longer sequence starting in Memphis, Tennessee, with stops in Pine Bluff, El Dorado, and Texarkana in Arkansas; and finally terminating in Dallas, Texas. While the plane was on the ground in El Dorado the crew (consisting of captain Ralph MacDonald Crosman, age 41, first officer William Fred Tumlinson, age 37, and flight attendant Marella Latzer, age 23) consulted with Flight Service Station staff and another set of pilots about a line of thunderstorms  to the west. After departing El Dorado no contact was made with any controllers en route. When the plane was overdue at Texarkana search and rescue was notified. Despite an extensive search along the proposed route of flight no wreckage was found. A controller at the Fort Worth air traffic control center advised the searchers that he had observed an unidentified VFR target departing El Dorado to the northwest before the plane went missing. With this information the wreckage was found after three days of searching. There were no survivors.

The cockpit voice recorder later revealed the first officer was flying the plane while the captain advised him of headings and altitudes to take to navigate around the storm. The captain deviated the plane  to the north in an attempt to go around it. The first officer expressed concern that he did not know their position and what the terrain clearance was for the area. After the captain ordered him to descend to  he consulted an en route instrument chart. He alerted the captain they were too low saying, "Minimum en route altitude here is forty-four hun . . ." At that point the recorder cut off as the plane struck Black Fork Mountain.

The National Transportation Safety Board investigation concluded that the crew did not discuss the details of their intended route with Flight Service or activate the instrument flight rules (IFR) flight plan forwarded from the airline dispatch to Flight Service. If they had been operating under instrument flight rules they would have been tracked by radar or required to make position reports to air traffic control en route. Under VFR they would only need to maintain contact with a controller while in controlled airspace. In this area of rural Arkansas there was no controlled airspace below . Further, according to Federal Aviation Regulations the airline dispatcher should have been notified the flight was proceeding under VFR. The captain also could have contacted controllers in Fort Worth to open their flight plan or receive radar vectoring in the area.

From the conversation of the crew on the recorder the board concluded the flight encountered inclement weather conditions during the flight and was likely in inclement weather conditions when it crashed. The board concluded that the cause of the accident was the captains decision to continue flying into inclement weather at night, his not taking advantage of the nearby navigational aids to get a fix on their position, and his decision to descend despite the first officers concerns about position and terrain.

In the coming years, FAA regulations pertaining to commercial flights would require that all airliners operate only on instrument flight plans when passengers are carried.  This rule has undoubtedly contributed much to the safety of airline travel, as flights under those rules specify altitudes and routes that must be followed and that have been predetermined to provide terrain clearance.

References

External links

 NTSB report

Airliner accidents and incidents in Arkansas
Airliner accidents and incidents involving controlled flight into terrain
Texas International Airlines accidents and incidents
Accidents and incidents involving the Convair CV-240 family
Aviation accidents and incidents in the United States in 1973
Disasters in Arkansas
Polk County, Arkansas
1973 in Arkansas
September 1973 events in the United States